The 1990–91 Northern Premier League season was the 23rd in the history of the Northern Premier League, a football competition in England. Teams were divided into two divisions; the Premier Division, won by Witton Albion, and the First Division, won by Whitley Bay. It was known as the HFS Loans League for sponsorship reasons.

Premier Division 

The Premier Division featured three new teams:

 Chorley relegated from the Football Conference
 Droylsden promoted as runners-up from Division One
 Leek Town promoted as champions from Division One

League table

Results

Division One 

Division One featured four new teams:
 Bridlington Town, promoted as champions of the NCEFL Premier Division
 Caernarfon Town and Rhyl, relegated from the  NPL Premier Division
 Warrington Town, promoted as champions of the NWCFL Division One

Promotion and relegation 
In the twenty-third season of the Northern Premier League Witton Albion (as champions) were automatically promoted to the Football Conference. None of the Premier Division sides were relegated, but South Liverpool folded at the end of the season, so three sides were promoted to the Premier Division; First Division winners Whitley Bay, second placed Emley and fourth placed Accrington Stanley. Colwyn Bay, Guiseley and Knowsley United were admitted to take these teams' places.

Cup results
Challenge Cup:
Southport bt. Buxton
President's Cup:
Witton Albion bt. Fleetwood Town
Northern Premier League Shield: Between Champions of NPL Premier Division and Winners of the Presidents Cup.
Witton Albion bt. Stalybridge Celtic 1
1 As Witton Albion won both the Northern Premier League and the Presidents cup, Stalybridge Celtic qualified as 2nd placed team of the NPL.

References

External links 
 Northern Premier League Tables at RSSSF

Northern Premier League seasons
6